The APEX flight academy based in Taitung Airport, Taiwan, is a flight training organization created in 2014.

Its particularity is that it is the first and only Taiwan CAA 141 (Civil Aviation Authority) certified flight training organisation in Taiwan. Its curriculum offers real flights and simulator based programs that enable students to be trained.

In 2018, the school signed an agreement with the French Civil Aviation University to conduct EASA certified trainings for airlines and manufacturers.

Apex had a dramatic training accident where an instructor and 2 students were forced to ditch in the ocean on an instrument training flight.

References

External link 
 Official website

2014 establishments in Taiwan
Aviation schools
Educational institutions established in 2014
Education in Taitung County